The flag of Lower Saxony consists of the flag of the Federal Republic of Germany in Schwarz-Rot-Gold, with the coat of arms of Lower Saxony, shifted slightly toward the hoist. This flag is the civil and state flag.  A double tailed version in 3:5 ratio is used as the state ensign.

History

The flag of Lower Saxony was introduced on 1 May 1951, and made official on 13 October 1952.  In the aftermath of World War II a neutral flag was needed for the state of Lower Saxony which consisted of the formerly separate entities of Hanover, Brunswick, Oldenburg, and Schaumburg-Lippe.  

Until the official launch of the current flag of Lower Saxony, the former national flags of their respective regions were used at official functions. Developed in parallel, there was a design using the Guelph Hanoverian flag of horizontal yellow and white stripes with the coat of arms in the middle. However, the non-Hanoverian parts of the state rejected this design.  Today, the former national flags of Hanover, Brunswick, Oldenburg and Schaumburg-Lippe are seen only at historical or folk events, such as festivals.

See also 

 Flags of German states

References

Lower Saxony
Lower Saxony
Culture of Lower Saxony
Lower Saxony